Randy Wagner (born 29 December 1959) is a Canadian volleyball player. He competed in the men's tournament at the 1984 Summer Olympics.

References

External links
 

1959 births
Living people
Canadian men's volleyball players
Olympic volleyball players of Canada
Volleyball players at the 1984 Summer Olympics
Sportspeople from Prince George, British Columbia